is a railway station on the privately operated Chōshi Electric Railway Line in Chōshi, Chiba, Japan.

Lines

Station layout

The station is unstaffed, and consists of a side platform serving a single track.

History
Nishi-Ashikajima Station opened on 1 March 1970 to serve the surrounding residential area.

Passenger statistics
In fiscal 2010, the station was used by an average of 40 passengers daily (boarding passengers only). The passenger figures for previous years are as shown below.

See also
 List of railway stations in Japan

References

External links

 Choshi Electric Railway station information 

Stations of Chōshi Electric Railway Line
Railway stations in Chiba Prefecture
Railway stations in Japan opened in 1970